Pylorus  or Pyloros was a town of ancient Crete, south of Gortyna.

Its site is located near modern Plora.

References

Populated places in ancient Crete
Former populated places in Greece